The Beijing University of Technology Gymnasium is an indoor arena located on the campus of the Beijing University of Technology in the Chaoyang District in Beijing, China.

The gymnasium hosted the 2008 Summer Olympics badminton and rhythmic gymnastics events.

The gymnasium seating capacity is 7,500 and has a floor space of 2700 square metres.

After the Olympic Games, it has served as a training facility for Chinese badminton teams and also as a sports and recreational activities centre for students and local communities.

The gymnasium was completed in September 2007.

References
BJUT profile

Beijing University of Technology
Venues of the 2008 Summer Olympics
Sports venues in Beijing
University sports venues in China
Indoor arenas in China
Olympic badminton venues
Olympic gymnastics venues
Sports venues completed in 2007